"Zoës and Zeldas" is the fourth episode of the first season of American animated television series BoJack Horseman. It was written by Peter A. Knight and directed by Amy Winfrey. The episode was released in the United States, along with the rest of season one, via Netflix on August 22, 2014. Wyatt Cenac, Margo Martindale, and Stanley Tucci provide their voices in guest roles in the episode.

Plot 
Todd decides to produce a rock opera and convinces BoJack to help. Wayne, Diane's ex-boyfriend, tries to write an article about Diane's current boyfriend, Mr. Peanutbutter.

References

External links 

 "Zoës and Zeldas" on Netflix
 

2014 American television episodes
BoJack Horseman episodes